Isonandra borneensis is a tree in the family Sapotaceae.

Description
The bark is brown. Inflorescences bear up to three white flowers.

Distribution and habitat
Isonandra borneensis is endemic to Borneo. Its habitat is forests from sea-level to  elevation.

References

borneensis
Endemic flora of Borneo
Trees of Borneo
Plants described in 1925
Flora of the Borneo lowland rain forests